Major-General George Handcock Thesiger  (6 October 1868 – 27 September 1915) was a senior officer in the British Army during the First World War who was killed in action during the Battle of Loos by German shellfire. His career had encompassed military service in Egypt, South Africa, Ireland, British India and France and had been rewarded with membership in two chivalric orders.

Early career
Thesiger was born in October 1868 into the Thesiger family, the son of Lieutenant General Charles Wemyss Thesiger and Charlotte Elizabeth Handcock. He was the middle of three children, with one older sister, Ethel Mary, and one younger brother, Gerald. He was the grandson of the politician Frederic Thesiger, 1st Baron Chelmsford and nephew of Major-General Frederic Thesiger and the judge Alfred Henry Thesiger.

Thesiger was educated at Eton College before attending the Royal Military College, Sandhurst for training as an infantry officer. Aged 22, Thesiger was Gazetted into the Rifle Brigade as a second lieutenant on 19 March 1890, and served with his unit in England until 1898, when the regiment was dispatched to Egypt. During his service in England he was promoted to lieutenant on 10 February 1892, and to captain on 26 July 1897. In Egypt, the Rifle Brigade served on the Nile expedition under Horatio Kitchener during the Mahdist War and was present at the Battle of Omdurman which decided the campaign. Thesiger received a brevet appointment as major on 16 November 1898 for his service.

The Rifle Brigade was then briefly stationed in Crete during operations to maintain peace between Turkish and Greek populations on the island. In October 1899, Thesiger and the second battalion were sent for service in South Africa in the aftermath of the outbreak of the Second Boer War. There Thesiger saw action and was badly wounded during the battle at Wagon Hill during the Siege of Ladysmith on 6 January 1900. He was mentioned in dispatches for his conduct during the engagement, and received a brevet appointment as lieutenant-colonel in the South African honours list on 29 November 1900.

Evacuated to Britain to recover from his wounds, Thesiger attended the Staff College, from which he graduated in late 1902. On 7 May 1902 he was appointed a deputy-assistant adjutant-general for Musketry, and until 1906 was in charge of musketry practice on Salisbury Plain, for the 2nd Army Corps. From there he moved to Ireland to work as Assistant Military Secretary to the GOC in Dublin until 1909. From there he was assigned to colonial service as the Inspector General of the King's African Rifles and in 1913 was dispatched to India as a lieutenant colonel to command the 4th Battalion of the Rifle Brigade. In 1913 in reward for his distinguished service he was made a Companion of the Order of St Michael and St George, and the following year was also made a Companion of the Order of the Bath.

In 1902, Thesiger married Frances Fremantle, daughter of General Fitzroy William Fremantle, and the couple had two children, daughter Oona Thesiger (later Buckley) and son Gerald Thesiger, who became a notable High Court Judge and minor politician.

First World War
At the outbreak of the First World War, Thesiger and his men were still in India and so did not arrive in Europe until December 1914 when the campaign in France was already well advanced. In May 1915 he was promoted to (temporary) Brigadier-General and given command of the 2nd Infantry Brigade serving in the trenches during the spring of 1915, where he was again mentioned in dispatches. On 27 August 1915, due to the shortage of senior officers, Thesiger was again promoted to (temporary) Major-General and placed in charge of the 33rd Division, one of the new Kitchener Divisions. He was only in this position for just over a week when on 8 September 1915, he was again transferred to the 9th (Scottish) Division, another new division which he would command during the opening of the battle of Loos.

Two days after the battle opened, Thesiger's division was suffering heavy casualties and reports were reaching divisional headquarters that the 73rd Infantry Brigade was on the verge of breaking. Thesiger immediately departed for the front line to investigate the situation with his divisional staff and was touring a trench at Fosse 8 opposite the Hohenzollern Redoubt when the German artillery opened fire on the British positions. One of the first shells fired exploded directly in the trench occupied by the 26th Brigade where the party was sheltering, instantly killing Major General Thesiger and his aides Major Le Mottee and Lieutenant Burney. None of their bodies were removed from the battlefield as fighting continued for another day and consequently only Burney's remains were recovered some time later. General Thesiger's name is amongst the 20,000 recorded on the Loos Memorial to the missing.

Notes

Bibliography

1868 births
1915 deaths
Military personnel from London
British Army major generals
British Army personnel of the Mahdist War
British Army personnel of the Second Boer War
British Army generals of World War I
British military personnel killed in World War I
Companions of the Order of the Bath
Companions of the Order of St Michael and St George
Graduates of the Royal Military College, Sandhurst
King's African Rifles officers
People educated at Eton College
Rifle Brigade officers
George
Graduates of the Staff College, Camberley